Cail MacLean (born September 30, 1976) is a Canadian former professional ice hockey player and is an assistant coach for the Calgary Flames of the National Hockey League.

Playing career 
MacLean was born in Middleton, Nova Scotia. He played his junior career with the Kingston Frontenacs of the Ontario Hockey League (OHL). After being skipped over in the NHL Entry Draft, MacLean signed his first professional contract with the ECHL's Jacksonville Lizard Kings in 1997.  He played two partial seasons with Jacksonville while also playing games in the American Hockey League (AHL) and the International Hockey League (IHL).

After signing with the Trenton Titans in 1999, MacLean spent most of the remainder of his career with the ECHL, seeing two full seasons of AHL action with the Hershey Bears (2002–03) and the Bridgeport Sound Tigers (2003–04). He served as the Titans' team captain and led them to the 2001 Kelly Cup finals, where they lost to the South Carolina Stingrays 4 games to 1.

He signed with the Reading Royals in 2004, and spent one season on the team. In 2005 he signed with the South Carolina Stingrays and was named team captain a year later. MacLean spent the remainder of his professional career with the Stingrays, leading them to the 2007–08 American Conference finals where they were bested by the Cincinnati Cyclones 4 games to 1.

Coaching career

South Carolina Stingrays
In 2008, MacLean announced his retirement from professional hockey and was named the assistant coach of the Stingrays soon after. He helped lead the Stingrays to the Kelly Cup championship in 2009.

After head coach Jared Bednar stepped down in 2009, MacLean was named the head coach of the team. He spent two seasons (2009–10 and 2010–11) with the Stingrays as head coach before accepting an assistant coaching position with the AHL's Abbotsford Heat in July 2011. MacLean led the Stingrays to two Kelly Cup playoff appearances and a 78-48-18 record during his tenure as head coach. While with the Stingrays, MacLean was selected as the American Conference coach for the 2010 ECHL All-Star Game and was recognized as the runner-up for the ECHL's 2009–10 John Brophy Award.

Abbotsford Heat
MacLean replaced Troy Ward as Abbotsford's assistant coach when Ward was named the Heat's head coach in June 2011. MacLean previously played for Ward when Ward was the head coach for the ECHL's Trenton Titans.

Adirondack Thunder
In 2015, he returned to the Calgary Flames' organization and was named head coach of the Adirondack Thunder of the ECHL. In 2017, the Flames ended their affiliation with the Thunder and MacLean moved up to an assistant coach position with the Flames' AHL affiliate, the Stockton Heat.

Stockton Heat
After serving one season as an assistant in Stockton, the Heat's head coach Ryan Huska moved up to the Flames as an assistant in 2018. MacLean was then promoted to the head coaching position for the 2018–19 AHL season. In 2021, the Calgary Flames promoted MacLean to assistant coach with the Flames after serving as the Heat's head coach for three seasons and a 72–65–16 record.

Awards

Coaching
American Conference coach, 2010 ECHL All-Star Game (2009–10)
Runner-up, John Brophy Award (2009–10)

Career statistics

References

External links

Cail MacLean at stingrayshockey.com.

1976 births
Bridgeport Sound Tigers players
Canadian ice hockey coaches
Canadian ice hockey forwards
Cincinnati Mighty Ducks players
Cleveland Lumberjacks players
Grand Rapids Griffins players
Hartford Wolf Pack players
Hershey Bears players
Ice hockey people from Nova Scotia
Indianapolis Ice players
Jacksonville Lizard Kings players
Kalamazoo Wings (1974–2000) players
Kingston Frontenacs players
Living people
Lowell Lock Monsters players
Philadelphia Phantoms players
People from Middleton, Nova Scotia
Providence Bruins players
Reading Royals players
South Carolina Stingrays coaches
South Carolina Stingrays players
Trenton Titans players